Pearson, California may refer to:
 Pearson, San Joaquin County, California
 Pearson, Yuba County, California